Yuliya Duben (born 25 November 1996) is a Belarusian footballer who plays as a forward and has appeared for the Belarus women's national team.

Career
Duben has been capped for the Belarus national team, appearing for the team during the 2019 FIFA Women's World Cup qualifying cycle.

References

External links
 
 
 

1996 births
Living people
Belarusian women's footballers
Belarus women's international footballers
Women's association football forwards
FC Minsk (women) players
Hatayspor (women's football) players